Joe Shanahan is the founder and owner of Metro Chicago and Smart Bar in Chicago, Illinois.  He is also the part owner of the Daily Bar and Grill, as well as Double Door.

Shanahan is regarded as an expert in the field of independent music promotion, speaking for groups including DePaul University, Columbia College, City of Chicago's Department of Cultural Affairs, MOBfest, South By Southwest, CIC and Canadian Music Week.

Shanahan was one of the earliest supporters of the Smashing Pumpkins.  He also managed the Smoking Popes as well as Diane Izzo.

Shanahan serves on the board of Rock For Kids, a charity providing Christmas gifts and music lessons to homeless and needy children in Chicago.

On October 11, 2007, Shanahan was awarded a Recording Academy Honors from the Chicago Chapter of The Recording Academy in recognition of Metro's 25 years in the Chicago music community.

In the summer of 2008, Shanahan publicly opposed the Promoters Ordinance proposed by the city of Chicago.  He was part of a group of business leaders who convinced the city to table the proposal.

References 

American music industry executives
Businesspeople from Chicago
Living people
people from Evergreen Park, Illinois
Year of birth missing (living people)